The Zhejiang Museum of Natural History is a museum that mainly focuses on exhibitions, collections and analysis on specimens of life science and earth science.  

It was founded in 1929 and is one of the earliest museums of natural historyin China.

In August 2009 museum occupied new building and it collection reached 130,000 exhibits on biological evolution.

History of Zhejiang Natural History Museum 

In 1929, the "West Lake Exhibition" was held in Hangzhou, which included departments of aquatic products, plants, animals, insects, precious stones, mining products and a zoo. The exhibition aroused great interest, so that the provincial government founded the "West Lake Museum" (Xīhú Bówùguǎn 西湖博物馆) on the basis of a petition to keep the museum-suitable exhibits. The future director of the museum, Dong Yumao, then began to systematically procure botanical exhibits from Fujian, Guangdong, Shandong and Qinghai. He pushed for an international exchange of exhibits. During the anti-Japanese war, Dong Yumao and his colleagues Zhong Guoyi, Qian Huixin, Kang Meiye and Gu Jianyi managed to preserve the museum's natural history objects, books and furnishings for posterity during multiple migrations.

For a fresh start after the founding of the People's Republic of China, the name was changed to "Zhejiang Museum" (Zhèjiāng Bówùguǎn 浙江博物馆). In 1984, the natural history department became independent under the current name "Zhejiang Natural History Museum". After major financial problems and a lack of public acceptance, a building was erected in 1984 to house the objects and for scientific work. The premises for the exhibition followed in 1998. By embedding the restructuring in the socio-political objectives, it was possible to anchor the museum as a cooperative model in the public consciousness, so that it was possible to open the museum in a new building in 2009.

See also
 List of museums in China

References

External links
Official website

1929 establishments in China
Museums established in 1929
Natural history museums in China
Museums in Hangzhou
National first-grade museums of China